The Associated Colleges of the South (ACS) is a consortium of 16 liberal arts colleges in the southern United States. It was formed in 1991. Its mission is to champion and enhance residential liberal arts education through collaborative projects among its member institutions.

Activities
The Associated Colleges of the South seeks to enhance member excellence and reduce costs through collaboration.  The consortium has primarily undertaken projects for the professional development of faculty. Collaborative efforts include: sharing of best practices; professional networking for faculty, staff and administrators through online communities and regular, in-person meetings; and joint-service activities such as shared legal counsel. ACS has been awarded several millions of dollars in private grants from various philanthropic foundations to be redistributed amongst member institutions on a competitive basis to support projects that require collaboration between and among members. A special focus has been collaborations that advance diversity and inclusion on member campuses, or that help faculty develop new skills and new pedagogical approaches, especially those that use the internet and computing.  ACS also manages a tuition exchange program that allows the children of the faculty and staff at member institutions to attend other institutions within the consortium.

Members
Birmingham-Southern College - Birmingham, Alabama
Centenary College of Louisiana - Shreveport, Louisiana 
Centre College - Danville, Kentucky 
Davidson College - Davidson, North Carolina
Furman University - Greenville, South Carolina
Hendrix College - Conway, Arkansas 
Millsaps College - Jackson, Mississippi
Morehouse College - Atlanta, Georgia
Rhodes College - Memphis, Tennessee
Rollins College - Winter Park, Florida
Sewanee: The University of the South - Sewanee, Tennessee
Southwestern University - Georgetown, Texas
Spelman College - Atlanta, Georgia
Trinity University - San Antonio, Texas
University of Richmond - Richmond, Virginia
Washington and Lee University - Lexington, Virginia

References

External links
Official website

College and university associations and consortia in the United States
.